Sham Raj I (1 June 1765 – 28 May 1822); born as Renuka Das Bhalerao,; popularly known as Raja Sham Raj Rai Rayan, was a general, a statesman, and an Indian noble who served as Prime Minister of Hyderabad. He is also known as Raja Shan Rai Rayan Renuka Das.

Born to a Hindu Brahmin family which traces its roots to Raja Krishnaji Pant, Sham Raj studied under the patronage of Nizam. He was a childhood friend of the Nizam and was a staunch Nizam loyalist throughout his life. In 1785 he was given the title of "Diyanatwanth" and mansab, 2,000 cavalry, and jewelry. In 1786 he became the peshkar (deputy minister) of the state. Some years later, Nizam appointed him dewan (prime minister) of the state during the absence of Arastu Jah to Poona.

Early life
Sham Raj was born on 1 June 1765 as Renuka Das Bhalerao to Raja Dhondoji Pant (also known as Raja Dhundiraj Pant) in Hyderabad. Sham Raj was a direct descendant of Krishnaji Pant, a Vatandar of Devagiri and a close aide of Mughal emperor Shah Jahan. Sham Raj's grandfather, Rai Naro Pant, migrated from Delhi to Hyderabad with Asaf Jah I. Rai Naro Pant served as 2nd peshkar (deputy minister) of Hyderabad Deccan after his elder brother Rai Moro Pant's death in 1750, who was the first peshkar (deputy minister) of Nizam of Hyderabad Deccan during the reign of Nizam-ul-Mulk, Asaf Jah I. Sham Raj's father Raja Dhondoji Pant was the elder son of Rai Naro Pant and served as third peshkar (deputy minister) during the reign of Sikandar Jah. They were Hindu by faith and belonged to the Deshastha Rigvedi Brahmin community. His family is the founder of the Dafter-e-Diwani (Department of Finance) in Hyderabad Deccan during Nizam ul Mulk Asif Jah I. The later peshkar and member of H. E. H. Nizam's executive council, Raja Sham Raj II from 1933 to 1948, is his great-grandson. The family is famously known as Rai Rayan Family in Hyderabad, India. The Rai Rayan family held zat mansabs of 5,000 to 7,000, with jagirs worth at least Rs.48,000 per year and also a fauj jagir of worth Rs.4,78,552 during the reign of Sham Raj I.

Sham Raj learned martial arts, studied the Sanskrit language (because of his Hindu faith), and learned accounting (because he had the hereditary charge of the royal treasury). According to author and former Hyderabad mayor K.K. Mudiraj, Sham Raj was given the hereditary rights of his father on 5 December 1783.

Career

The Rai Rayan family are founders of Dafter-e-Diwani, a department of finance in the Hyderabad state They are hereditary dafterdars of half of the Nizam state, which are known as Western Subahs. After the death of Raja Dhundiraj Pant in February 1783, his defterdarship of four hereditary western Subhas such the Carnatic, Bidar, Aurangabad and Khandesh were transferred to his elder son, Rai Omakant Rao. Rai Omakant Rao died in the same year as his father in August 1783. After the death of his elder brother Rai Omakant Rao, Renukadas alia Raja Sham Raj was given the hereditary rights of his father. According to author K. K. Mudiraj, Sham Raj was given the rights on 5 December 1783 with the title Raja Rayan. Author Mudiraj says, "In the 1784, along with four western subahs he was also given the maash and watan of Sirdeshpandgiri over all the suburbs of the Deccan and also Sirdeshpandgiri in the parganas of Medak, Gulbarga, Nanded and Sirdeshmukhi of Partabpur and many other jagirs". In 1786 he was appointed as the peshkar (deputy minister) of the state.

Raja Sham Raj played a prominent role in the Second Anglo-Mysore War and Third Anglo-Mysore War against Hyder Ali and Tipu Sultan of Mysore on the side of Marathas and British. In 1791–92, Sham Raj also led the forces of Nizam Ali Khan to the Siege of Seringapatam. Quoting on the influence of Raja Sham Raj in the Second Anglo-Mysore War, Third Anglo-Mysore War and the Treaty of Seringapatam, author M. V. Shiva Prasad Rao says, "Raja Shamraj played a prominent part on behalf of the Nizam of Hyderabad in the war against Tipu Sultan of Mysore, in 1781. In his correspondence there is a reference to the two sons of Tipu Sultan who were taken as hostages soon after the Third Mysore War (1790-1792) to compel the ruler of Mysore to fulfil the obligations arising out of the Treaty of Seringapatnam (1792)".

After the victory over the Tipu Sultan in 1792, Renukadas was again honoured with the title "Raja Sham Raj" with many additional honors for his contribution in the war.
 
Later he was officiated as dewan (prime minister) during the absence at Poona of Arastu Jah, which he held for two years from 1795 to 1797.

Titles
The following are the titles received by Renukadas:

1765-1780 - Rajkumar Renuka Das Dhundiraj Bhalerao
1780-1783 - Rai Renuka Das Dhundiraj Bhalerao
1783-1785 - Rai Rayan Renuka Das Dhundiraj Bhalerao
1785-1786 - Rai Rayan Diyanatwanth Renuka Das Dhundiraj Bhalerao
1786-1795 - Raja Rai Rayan Diyanatwanth Sham Raj Renuka Das Dhundiraj Bhalerao
1795-1822 - Meherban Madar-ul-Maham Raja Rai Rayan Diyanatwanth Sham Raj Renuka Das Dhundiraj  Bhalerao Bahadur

Religious and spiritual views
Religion and spirituality were very important to Sham Raj throughout his life. In fact, he made his own spiritual journey by visiting various hindu pilgrimages throughout his life. Author K. K. Mudiraj says, "Raja Sham Raj was of a religious turn of mind and setting aside his honours
proceeded to Rameshwaram where he stayed for no less than six years.".

Notes

References

Bibliography

Further reading

External links

1765 births
1822 deaths
Indian generals
Prime Ministers of Hyderabad State
Indian politicians